The Bureau of Royal Thai Mint,, is situated in Pathum Thani, Thailand. It is a sub-division of the Treasury Department, Ministry of Finance.

History 

The first mint was established in 1860, inside the Grand Palace, as "โรงกระสาปน์สิทธิการ". Because of limited space, the mint was moved to the new building in 1875 (where Wat Phra Kaew Museum is located today). Then it was moved to Chaofah road in 1902 (where the National Gallery is located today), to Padipat road in 1972 and to the present mint in 2002. The mint at Pathum Thani was officially opened by Princess Maha Chakri Sirindhorn on July 2, 2003.

The Royal Thai Mint is responsible for the production of Thai coins, medals and Royal Thai orders and decorations.

The coin distributor is responsible of the Bureau of Monetary Management.

External links
  Royal Thai Mint website.

References

Thai
Currencies of Thailand
1860 establishments in Siam